Instruction of Amenemope (also called Instructions of Amenemopet, Wisdom of Amenemopet) is a literary work composed in Ancient Egypt, most likely during the Ramesside Period (ca. 1300–1075 BCE); it contains thirty chapters of advice for successful living, ostensibly written by the scribe Amenemope son of Kanakht as a legacy for his son. A characteristic product of the New Kingdom “Age of Personal Piety”, the work reflects on the inner qualities, attitudes, and behaviors required for a happy life in the face of increasingly difficult social and economic circumstances. It is widely regarded as one of the masterpieces of ancient near-eastern wisdom literature and has been of particular interest to modern scholars because of its similarity to the later biblical Book of Proverbs.

Overview
Amenemope belongs to the literary genre of "instruction" (Egyptian sebayt). The author takes for granted the principles of Natural law and concentrates on the deeper matters of conscience. He counsels that the weaker classes of society are defended, respect is shown to the elderly, widows and the poor, whilst condemning any abuse of power or authority.
The author draws an emphatic contrast between two types of men: the "silent man", who goes about his business without drawing attention to himself or demanding his rights, and the "heated man", who makes a nuisance of himself to everyone and is constantly picking fights with others over matters of no real importance. Contrary to worldly expectation, the author assures his reader that the former will ultimately receive the divine blessing, while the latter will inevitably go to destruction. Amenemope counsels modesty, self-control, generosity, and scrupulous honesty, while discouraging pride, impetuosity, self-advancement, fraud, and perjury—not only out of respect for Maat, the cosmic principle of right order, but also because "attempts to gain advantage to the detriment of others incur condemnation, confuse the plans of god, and lead inexorably to disgrace and punishment."

Witnesses and publication
The most complete text of the Instruction of Amenemope is British Museum Papyrus 10474, which was acquired in Thebes by E. A. Wallis Budge in early 1888. In November 1888, Peter le Page Renouf, Keeper of the Department of Oriental Antiquities at the British Museum (and Budge's supervisor), made mention of a "remarkable passage" from the papyrus and quoted a few words from it in an otherwise unrelated article about the story of Joseph in the Book of Genesis; but Renouf was forced into retirement in 1891, and publication of the papyrus was delayed for more than three decades while Budge concentrated on other projects such as the Book of the Dead.

In 1922 Budge finally published a short account of the text along with brief hieroglyphic extracts and translations in a French academic work, followed in 1923 by the official British Museum publication of the full text in photofacsimile with hieroglyphic transcription and translation.  In 1924 he went over the same ground again in a somewhat more popular vein, including a more extensive commentary.  Subsequent publications of BM 10474 in hieroglyphic transcription include those of H.O. Lange (1925), J. Ruffle (1964), and V. Laisney (2007). Photographic copies of the papyrus are available from the British Museum.

Since the initial publication of BM 10474, additional fragments of Amenemope have been identified on a scrap of papyrus, four writing tablets, an ostracon, and a graffito, bringing the total number of witnesses to eight. Unfortunately, none of the other texts is very extensive, and the British Museum papyrus remains the primary witness to the text.  As can be seen from the following table, the dates assigned by scholars to the various witnesses range from a maximum of ca. 1069 BCE (for the papyrus fragment and one of the writing tablets) down to a minimum of ca. 500 BCE (for BM 10474):

Biblical parallels
Egyptian influence on Israel and Judah was particularly strong in the reign of Hezekiah during Egypt's Third Intermediate Period; as a result, "Hebrew literature is permeated with concepts and figures derived from the didactic treatises of Egypt", with Amenemope often cited as the foremost example.  Even in his first brief publication of excerpts from Amenemope in 1922, Budge noted its obvious resemblance to the biblical wisdom books.  He amplified these comments in his 1923 and 1924 publications, observing that the religiously based morality of Amenemope "closely resembles" the precepts of the Hebrew Bible, and adducing specific parallels between Amenemope and texts in Proverbs, Psalms, and Deuteronomy.  Others soon followed his lead.

Erman's position
The most notable of these was Adolf Erman, "the Dean of all Egyptologists", who in 1924 published an extensive list of correspondences between the texts of Amenemope and the biblical Book of Proverbs, with the bulk of them concentrated in Proverbs 22:17–23:11.  It was Erman who used Amenemope to emend a difficult reading in the text of Proverbs 22:20, where the Hebrew word shilshom ("three days ago") appeared to be a copyist's error that could be meaningfully translated only with difficulty. Erman pointed out that substituting the similar word sheloshim ("thirty") not only made good sense in context, but yielded the following close parallel between the two texts, with the now-restored "thirty sayings" in Proverbs 22:20 corresponding exactly to the thirty numbered chapters in Amenemope:

(Proverbs 22:20):  "Have I not written for you thirty sayings of counsel and knowledge?" (ESV)
(Amenemope, ch. 30, line 539): "Look to these thirty chapters; they inform, they educate."

Erman also argued that this correspondence demonstrated that the Hebrew text had been influenced by the Egyptian instead of the other way around, since the Egyptian text of Amenemope explicitly enumerates thirty chapters whereas the Hebrew text of Proverbs does not have such clear-cut divisions, and would therefore be more likely to lose the original meaning during copying.  Since Erman's time there has been a near consensus among scholars that there exists a literary connection between the two works, although the direction of influence remains contentious even today. The majority has concluded that Proverbs 22:17–23:10 was dependent on Amenemope; a minority is split between viewing the Hebrew text as the original inspiration for Amenemope and viewing both works as dependent on a now lost Semitic source.

The majority position
A major factor in determining the direction of influence is the date at which Amenemope was composed. At one time the mid-1st millennium BC was put forward as a likely date for the composition of Amenemope, which gave some support to the argument for the priority of Proverbs. However, Jaroslav Černý, whose authority on New Kingdom paleography was so great that his conclusions were considered "unquestionable", dated the fragmentary Amenemope text on the Cairo 1840 ostracon to the late 21st dynasty.  Since a 21st-dynasty date inevitably makes Amenemope chronologically prior to the earliest possible date for Proverbs, this would definitively establish the priority of Amenemope over Proverbs and make influence in the other direction impossible.

Other evidence for Egyptian priority includes:
the close literary relationship between Amenemope and earlier Ancient Egyptian works such as the Instruction of Kagemni and the Instruction of Ptahhotep (both dated to at least the 12th dynasty) and the Instruction of Ani (dated to the late 18th or early 19th dynasty);
the demonstrably native Egyptian character of the genre, themes, and vocabulary of Amenemope;
the discovery of the editorial and structural mechanisms by which the Egyptian original was adapted by the biblical author.

By the 1960s there was a virtual consensus among scholars in support of the priority of Amenemope and its influence on Proverbs.  For example, John A. Wilson declared in the mid-20th century: "[W]e believe that there is a direct connection between these two pieces of wisdom literature, and that Amen-em-Opet was the ancestor text. The secondary nature of the Hebrew seems established."  Many study Bibles and commentaries followed suit, including the Jerusalem Bible, introductions to the Old Testament by Pfeiffer and Eissfeldt, and others. The translators of the Catholic New American Bible, reflecting and extending this agreement, even went so far as to emend the obscure Hebrew text of Proverbs 22:19 (traditionally translated as "I have made known to you this day, even to you") to read "I make known to you the words of Amen-em-Ope."

The minority response
R. N. Whybray, who at one point supported the majority position, changed sides during the 1990s and cast doubt on the relationship between Amenemope and Proverbs, while still acknowledging certain affinities. He argued, in part, that only some of the topics in the Egyptian text can be found in Proverbs 22:17–24:22 and that their sequence differs.  J. A. Emerton and Nili Shupak have subsequently argued strongly against Whybray's conclusions. John Ruffle takes a more conservative approach: "The connection so casually assumed is often very superficial, rarely more than similarity of subject matter, often quite differently treated and does not survive detailed examination. I believe it can merit no more definite verdict than 'not proven' and that it certainly does not exist to the extent that is often assumed", and "The parallels that I have drawn between [the huehuetlatolli of the Aztecs], (recorded by Bernardino de Sahagún in the 1500s) and ancient Near Eastern wisdom are in no way exhaustive, but the fact that they can be produced so easily underlines what should be obvious anyway, that such precepts and images are universally acceptable and hence that similar passages may occur in Proverbs and Amenemope simply by coincidence."

Comparison of texts
A number of passages in the Instruction of Amenemope have been compared with the Book of Proverbs, including:

(Proverbs 22:17–18): "Incline thine ear, and hear the words of the wise, And apply thine heart to my doctrine; For it is pleasant if thou keep them in thy belly, that they may be established together upon thy lips"

(Amenemope, ch. 1): "Give thine ear, and hear what I say, And apply thine heart to apprehend; It is good for thee to place them in thine heart, let them rest in the casket of thy belly; That they may act as a peg upon thy tongue"

(Proverbs 22:22): "Rob not the poor, for he is poor, neither oppress (or crush) the lowly in the gate."

(Amenemope, ch. 2): "Beware of robbing the poor, and oppressing the afflicted."

(Proverbs 22:24–5): "Do not befriend the man of anger, Nor go with a wrathful man, Lest thou learn his ways and take a snare for thy soul."

(Amenemope, ch. 10): "Associate not with a passionate man, Nor approach him for conversation; Leap not to cleave to such an one; That terror carry thee not away."

(Proverbs 22:29): "[if you] You see a man quick in his work, before kings will he stand, before cravens, he will not stand."

(Amenemope, ch. 30): "A scribe who is skillful in his business findeth worthy to be a courtier"

(Proverbs 23:1): "When thou sittest to eat with a ruler, Consider diligently what is before thee; And put a knife to thy throat, If thou be a man given to appetite. Be not desirous of his dainties, for they are breads of falsehood."

(Amenemope, ch. 23): "Eat not bread in the presence of a ruler, And lunge not forward(?) with thy mouth before a governor(?). When thou art replenished with that to which thou has no right, It is only a delight to thy spittle. Look upon the dish that is before thee, And let that (alone) supply thy need." (see above)

(Proverbs 23:4–5): "Toil not to become rich, And cease from dishonest gain; For wealth maketh to itself wings, Like an eagle that flieth heavenwards"

(Amenemope, ch. 7): "Toil not after riches; If stolen goods are brought to thee, they remain not over night with thee. They have made themselves wings like geese. And have flown into the heavens."

(Proverbs 23:9): "Speak not in the hearing of a fool, for he will despise the wisdom of thy words"

(Amenemope, ch. 21): "Empty not thine inmost soul to everyone, nor spoil (thereby) thine influence"

(Proverbs 23:10): "Remove not the widows landmark; And enter not into the field of the fatherless."

(Amenemope, ch. 6): "Remove not the landmark from the bounds of the field...and violate not the widows boundary"

(Proverbs 23:12): "Apply thine heart unto instruction and thine ears to the words of knowledge"

(Amenemope, ch. 1): "Give thine ears, hear the words that are said, give thine heart to interpret them."

See also
Sebayt
Maat
Ancient Egyptian literature
Wisdom literature

Notes

References
Black, James Roger.  "The Instruction of Amenemope: A Critical Edition and Commentary—Prolegomenon and Prologue" (Ph.D. dissertation, University of Wisconsin–Madison, 2002).
Boadt, Lawrence E.  "Proverbs," in Dianne Bergant and Robert J. Karris, eds.  The Collegeville Bible Commentary:  Based on the New American Bible with Revised New Testament (Liturgical Press, 1989), 644-674. 
Bryce, Glendon E.  A Legacy of Wisdom:  the Egyptian Contribution to the Wisdom of Israel (Bucknell University Press, 1979) 
Budge, E. A. Wallis.  By Nile and Tigris, a Narrative of Journeys in Egypt and Mesopotamia on behalf of the British Museum between the Years 1886 and 1913, 2 vols. (London:  J. Murray, 1920).
Budge, E. A. Wallis.  "The Precepts of Life by Amen-em-Apt, the Son of Ka-Nekht," Recueil d'études égyptologiques dédiées à la mémoire de Jean-François Champollion à l'occasion du centenaire de la lettre à M. Dacier relative à l'alphabet des hiéroglyphes phonétiques (Paris:  E. Champion, 1922), 431-446.
Budge, E. A. Wallis.  Facsimiles of Egyptian Hieratic Papyri in the British Museum, with Descriptions, Summaries of Contents, etc., 2nd series (London:  British Museum. Dept. of Egyptian and Assyrian Antiquities, 1923), 5-6, 9-19, 41-51, plates I-XIV.
Budge, E. A. Wallis.  Teaching of Amen-Em-Apt, Son of Kanekht (London, 1924; reprinted Kessinger Publishing, 2003), .
Eissfeldt, Otto.  The Old Testament:  An Introduction (tr. by P. R. Ackroyd; Harper & Row, 1965).
Emerton, J. A.  "The Teaching of Amenemope and Proverbs XXII 17-XXIV 22:  Further Reflections on a Long-standing Problem," Vetus Testamentum 51 (2001), 431-465.
Erman, Adolf.  "Eine ägyptische Quelle der 'Sprüche Salomos'," Sitzungsberichte der Preussischen Akademie der Wissenschaften 15 (1924), 86-93, pl. VI-VII.
Fox, Michael V.  "The formation of Proverbs 22:17-23:11," Die Welt des Orients 38 (2008), 22-37.
Gardiner, Alan H.  "Writing and Literature," in S. R. K. Glanville, The Legacy of Egypt (Oxford, 1942).
Jones, Alexander, ed.  The Jerusalem Bible (Doubleday, 1966).
Lange, H. O.  Das Weisheitsbuch des Amenemope, aus dem Papyrus 10,474 des British museum, Danske videnskabornes selskab, Historisk-filologiske meddelelser 11, 2 (København:  A.F. Høst & søn, 1925).
Laisney, Vincent Pierre-Michel. L’Enseignement d'Amenemope, Studia Pohl 16 (Pontifical Biblical Institute, 2007).
Lichtheim, Miriam.  Ancient Egyptian Literature, Volume I:  The Old and Middle Kingdoms (University of California Press, 1973), 61-80.
Lichtheim, Miriam.  Ancient Egyptian Literature, Volume II: The New Kingdom (University of California Press, 1976), 146-163, .
Mercer, Samuel A. B.  "A New-Found Book of Proverbs," Anglican Theological Review 8 (1926), 237-244.
Mertz, Barbara.  Temples, Tombs and Hieroglyphs (Dodd, Mead, & Co., 1978).
Overland, Paul.  "Structure in The Wisdom of Amenemope and Proverbs," in J. E. Coleson and V. H. Matthews, eds., Go to the Land I Will Show You:  Studies in Honor of Dwight W. Young (Eisenbrauns, 1996), 275-291. 
Pfeiffer, Robert H.  Introduction to the Old Testament (Harper & Brothers, 1948).
Posener, Georges.  "One More Duplicate of the Hood Papyrus," Journal of Egyptian Archaeology 31 (1945), 112.
Quack, Joachim Friedrich.  Die Lehren des Ani:  Ein neuägyptischer Weisheitstext in seinem kulturellen Umfeld, OBO 141 (Göttingen:  Vandenhoeck & Ruprecht, 1994).
Ray, J. D.  "Egyptian Wisdom Literature," in John Day, et al., Wisdom in Ancient Israel" (Cambridge University Press, 1997), 17-29, .
Renouf, Peter le Page.  "The Thematic Vowel in Egyptian," Proceedings of the Society of Biblical Archaeology 11 (1888).
Ruffle, John.  "The Teaching of Amenemope and its Connexion with the Book of Proverbs" (M.A. Thesis, University of Liverpool, 1964).
Ruffle, John.  "The Teaching of Amenemope and its Connection with the Book of Proverbs," in Roy B. Zuck, ed., Learning from the Sages;  Studies on the Book of Proverbs (Baker Books, 1995), 293-331.
Shupak, Nili.  The Instruction of Amenemope and Proverbs 22:17-24:22 from the Perspective of Contemporary Research,"  in R. L. Troxel, K. G. Friebel, and D. R. Magary, eds., Seeking Out the Wisdom of the Ancients:  Essays Offered to Honor Michael V. Fox on the Occasion of His Sixty-Fifth Birthday (Eisenbrauns, 2005), 203-217. 
Textual Notes on the New American Bible (St. Anthony's Guild, 1970).
Usick, Patricia.  "Review of The Letters of Peter le Page Renouf (1822-1897)", British Museum Studies in Ancient Egypt and Sudan 5 (2006), 13-16.
Washington, Harold C.  Wealth and Poverty in the Instruction of Amenemope and the Hebrew Proverbs, SBL Dissertation Series 142 (Scholars Press, 1994).
Weeks, Stuart.  Early Israelite Wisdom (Clarendon Press, 1994), 168-169.
Whybray, Roger Norman.  The Book of Proverbs: A Survey of Modern Study (Brill, 1995). 
Whybray, Roger Norman.  The Composition of the Book of Proverbs (JSOT Press, 1994).
Whybray, Roger Norman.  "The Structure and Composition of Proverbs 22:17-24:22," in S. E. Porter, P. Joyce, and D. E. Orton, eds., Crossing the Boundaries:  Essays in Biblical Interpretation in Honour of Michael D. Golder (Brill, 1994), 83-96.
Williams, Ronald J.  "The Alleged Semitic Original of the Wisdom of Amenemope," Journal of Egyptian Archaeology 47 (1961), 100-106.
Williams, Ronald J.  "Egypt and Israel"," in J. R. Harris, The Legacy of Egypt, 2nd ed. (Oxford, 1971), 257-290.
Williams, Ronald J.  "Piety and Ethics in the Ramessid Age," Journal of the Society for the Study of Egyptian Antiquities 8 (1978), 131-137.
Wilson, John A.  The Culture of Ancient Egypt (originally The Burden of Egypt; University of Chicago Press, 1951).

External links
Partial English Translation in Maat-Sofiatopia website.
Papyrus BM 10474 British Museum
E.A. Wallis Budge, "The Teaching of Amen-Em-Apt, Son of Kanekht" (1924)

Book of Proverbs
Ancient Egyptian instruction literature